Have, Don't Have is the fifth extended play by South Korean girl group Dal Shabet, released on November 13, 2012. "Have, Don't Have" was used as the promotional song. The album contains four new songs, one remix and one instrumental.

History 
Following a brief musical hiatus, Dal Shabet released their fifth extended play Have, Don't Have, with the lead single "Have, Don't Have" (Korean: "있기 없기").  The title track is officially described as 'a disco song that is easy for listeners to sing along to and the lyrics describe a girl’s cute feelings towards a guy'.  This is Dal Shabet's first release that was not produced with the help of E-Tribe, their in-company producers and managers. Producers and composers that contributed to the album include Kim Do Hoon, MARCO, DK$HINE, Min Yeon Jae and MIIII.

A limited edition version of the album, which included a photo book and DVD, was also released.

Track listing

Chart performance

Singles

Album chart

Sales and certifications

References

External links 
  

2012 albums
Dal Shabet albums